US Post Office-Hanover is a historic post office building located at Hanover, York County, Pennsylvania.  It was designed by Office of the Supervising Architect James Knox Taylor in 1910 and built between 1911 and 1913.  It is a sandstone building in the Renaissance Revival style.  It consists of a five bay by two bay front section with a low hipped roof, and a four bay rear extension.  The front facade features a trio of arches flanked by rectangular windows at either end. The post office closed in 1969, after which the building was occupied by a clothing store("Trone & Weikert") until being renovated for offices in 1991.

It was added to the National Register of Historic Places in 1992. It is located in the Hanover Historic District.

References

Hanover
Renaissance Revival architecture in Pennsylvania
Colonial Revival architecture in Pennsylvania
Government buildings completed in 1913
Buildings and structures in York County, Pennsylvania
1913 establishments in Pennsylvania
National Register of Historic Places in York County, Pennsylvania